Rab is a town (grad) on the island of Rab in Croatia. According to the 2011 census the total population of the town was 8,065, whereas only 437 lived in the titular settlement (naselje). Rab, the settlement, is located on a small peninsula on the southwestern side of the island.

The town has a long history that dates back to 360 BC when it was inhabited by the Illyrians. The island was the frontier between the regions of Liburnia and Dalmatia. From the third century BC to the sixth century AD Rab was part of the Roman Empire, and Emperor Augustus proclaimed it a municipium in 10 BC. It was the first town of Roman Dalmatia to be given the honorary title "felix".

The worst disaster in the town's history was an outbreak of the plague in 1456 that decimated the city's population.

There are many churches in the town. The largest is St. Mary the Blessed, which was built in the 13th century. The church of St. Justine is now a museum of sacred arts, while the chapel of St. Christopher (dedicated to the patron saint of the island) is nowadays called the Lapidarium. The four church bell towers became the symbol of the town and island. The oldest dates back to the eleventh century.

Saint Marinus, the Christian founder of San Marino, was a native of Rab who is said to have fled the island under Diocletian's persecution in AD 301.

Population

Gallery

References

External links
 Virtual tour of Rab town with photo gallery
 About town Rab history, squares and church towers

Attribution
 The original version of this article was taken from the Wikipedia article Rab.

Cities and towns in Croatia
Populated places in Primorje-Gorski Kotar County
Rab
Populated coastal places in Croatia
Illyrian Croatia